The World Transnational Open Teams Championship is a major side event conducted by the World Bridge Federation during the semifinal and final stages of its world championships for national teams at contract bridge—the Bermuda Bowl, Venice Cup, and Senior Bowl. New teams may enter the Transnational, as well as national teams eliminated before the semifinals of the main events—Open, Women, and Seniors respectively. It is not required that all team members be from one country, hence the term transnational. A series of Swiss matches qualifies eight teams for three knockout rounds which conclude during the finals of the main events.

The 15-day "World Team Championships" meet occurs in odd years and the first Transnational Open was added to program in 1997. The eighth rendition was held in October 2011 in Veldhoven, Netherlands.

Pierre Zimmermann's professional teams have won the last two renditions and "Zimmermann" will be the favorite again. Beginning 2011, the Italian pair Fantoni–Nunes and Norwegian pair Helgemo–Helness, from the 2007 and 2009 winners respectively, have been hired to join Zimmermann–Multon full-time, under contract expiring 2016. (From 2012 all six members will be citizens of Monaco and the team will be a prohibitive favorite to represent Monaco internationally.)

The 2013 edition was won by the USA's Gordon team.

Results
The World Transnational has always been a major side event conducted alongside the Bermuda Bowl and Venice Cup. Recently it has been possible to enter the Transnational Teams after elimination from the main events before their semifinals.

References

External links
World Transnational Open Team Championship To Date at the World Bridge Federation

Transnational Open Teams